The 1988–89 season was Blackpool F.C.'s 81st season (78th consecutive) in the Football League. They competed in the 24-team Division Three, then the third tier of English league football, finishing nineteenth.

Andy Garner was the club's top scorer, with fifteen goals (eleven in the league, two in the FA Cup and two in the League Cup).

Table

References

Blackpool F.C.
Blackpool F.C. seasons